The 2008 Archery World Cup was the 3rd edition of the international archery circuit, organised by the World Archery Federation. The best individual and mixed performers in each discipline over the three legs then joined host representatives in qualifying for the finals.

Competition rules and scoring
The compound legs consisted of a 50m qualification round of 72 arrows, followed by the compound round at 50m on a 6-zone target face, using cumulative scoring for all individual, team and mixed competitions. The top four individual performers (with no more than two from each country) proceeded to the finals.

The recurve legs consisted of a FITA qualification round, followed by a 72m Olympic set system . The top seven individual performers (with no more than two from each country), plus one host nation representative if not already qualified, proceeded to the finals; the top mixed team performer proceeded to face the host nation at the finals, which were the same competition format as the legs. The team competition was not competed at the finals.

Competitors' top three scores go towards qualification. The scores awarded in the legs were as follows:

Individual scoring

Calendar

Results

Recurve

Men's individual

Women's individual

Men's team

Women's team

Compound

Men's individual

Women's individual

Men's team

Women's team

Medals table

Qualification

Recurve

Men's individual

Women's individual

Compound

Men's individual

Women's individual

Nations ranking

World Cup Final

Recurve

Men's individual

Women's individual

Compound

Men's individual

Women's individual

References

World
Archery World Cup
2008 in Turkish sport
International archery competitions hosted by Turkey
Sport in Antalya
21st century in Antalya
Archery competitions in the Dominican Republic
International archery competitions hosted by Croatia
2008 in Dominican Republic sport
2008 in Croatian sport
International archery competitions hosted by France
2008 in French sport
International sports competitions hosted by the Dominican Republic